Bolo Dugga Maiki is an Indian Bengali language romantic comedy film directed by Raj Chakraborty and produced by Shrikant Mohta and Mahendra Soni under the banner of Shree Venkatesh Films. The film stars Ankush Hazra and Nusrat Jahan in lead roles. The movie is partially based on the 2015 Malayalam movie Oru Vadakkan Selfie.

Plot 
Shamyo is a carefree man who lives an extravagant life with his two best friends Bangal and Totlu. Due to his activities, he is disowned by his grandfather and forced to leave his home. The story follows the misadventures of Shamyo after leaving his house. Problems arrived when he took selfies with an unknown girl, Uma, and send those selfies to his best friends through their WhatsApp group on a train journey. As his best friends posted selfie on Facebook, Uma's family members misunderstood that Shamyo was the guy with whom Uma eloped. Gobor Pal, Uma's father threatened Shamyo that if he can't return Uma home then he would be killed. After many misadventures, Shamyo and his two friends returned Uma to her home while Shamyo pretending to be "Niloy", the guy with whom Uma had eloped. Gobor's four brothers became angry on Shamyo. But Uma's grandmother accepted Shamyo as her grandson-in-law. Unhappy with her decision, the five brothers ought to take revenge on Shamyo. After winning the 'dhunuchi nach' competition, Uma's family accepted Shamyo and arranged for their wedding. But Shamyo complicated the situation by returning to his grandfather without telling anyone of Uma's family. On the other hand, Uma learned that she was adopted by her family and so left the house. But Shamyo returned her to her family. Shamyo's grandfather saw the change in his grandson and accepted the wedding of Shamyo with Uma.

Cast

 Ankush Hazra as Shamyo
 Nusrat Jahan as Uma
 Rajatava Dutta as Gobor, Uma's father
 Sudip Mukherjee as Uma's uncle
 Sourav Das as Bangal, Shamyo's friend
 Rajdeep Ghosh as Totlu, Shamyo's friend
 Paran Bandopadhyay as Shamyo's grandfather
 Kaushik Banerjee as Shamyo's uncle
 Debika Mitra
 Rupsa Dasgupta
 Parthasarathi Chakraborty
 Sugato Roy
 Proshor Biswas
 Soumen Bhattacharya
 Bulbuli Pandja
 Puspita Mukherjee
 Ishita Chatterjee
 Horidas Chatterjee as Jhinge
 Arun Kumar Guha Thakurata
 Supriyo Dutta as bar owner (cameo appearance)
 Moyna Mukherjee as Pia, Uma's sister-in-law

Soundtrack

Notes
 "Hote Paare Na" was programmed by Prasad Shashte and Suvam Moitra; guitar performed by Ankur Mukherjee and Suvam Moitra; pre-mixed by Suvam Moitra; mix and master by Eric Pillai
 "Dugga Ma" was mixed and mastered by Eric Pillai
 "Tomar Dyakha Naai" was programmed by Hyacinth D'souza and Soumo - Subho; mixed and mastered by Shadab Rayeen
 "Lukochuri" was programmed by Sourav Roy, mixed and mastered by Suvam Moitra, with an African chorus by Mustapha Mensa, guitar by Banjo Dotara, ukulele by Ankur Mukherjee and cajon by Deepesh and Onkar

Production 
Bolo Dugga Maiki was produced by SVF Entertainment. Some parts of the film were filmed in Murshidabad, Nashipur, Bangkok.

Release 
Bolo Dugga Maiki was released by SVF Entertainment in India alongside the holiday of Puja. The film was released alongside other high-profile films releasing for the Puja holiday, such as Yeti Obhijaan and Cockpit. In response to this, actor Ankush Hazra said "So many films with good content are being released this Puja. I think people will find it the perfect time to watch Bengali movies as this is the time to go back to their roots and be proud of 'Bangaliana' (Bengaliness)."

It was announced in November that Bangladeshi film company Jaaz Multimedia would release the film in Bangladesh on 17 November 2017, after a deal was made with SVF Entertainment. The deal made between Jaaz Multimedia and SVF Entertainment was made under the South Asia Free Trade Area agreement (SAFTA).

Critical reception 
Srijoy Mukherjee of The Times of India wrote in his review that the film had a promising start, but eventually becomes just a generic comedy. Noting the film's direction, vision, usage of product placements and lack of usage of the Puja theme and Nusrat Jahan's character, the film was let down by an average script. However, the review the performances of the two lead actors, especially Ankush Hazra, noting his expressions, comic timing and body language and lauding his ability as a comic actor.

References

External links
 

Bengali-language Indian films
2010s Bengali-language films
Indian romantic comedy films
2017 romantic comedy films
Films about festivals
Bengali remakes of  Malayalam films
Films scored by Arindam Chatterjee
Films directed by Raj Chakraborty